Self-harm is intentional behavior that is considered harmful to oneself. This is most commonly regarded as direct injury of one's own skin tissues usually without a suicidal intention. Other terms such as cutting, self-injury, and self-mutilation have been used for any self-harming behavior regardless of suicidal intent. The most common form of self-harm is using a sharp object to cut the skin. Other forms include scratching, hitting, or burning body parts. While earlier usage included interfering with wound healing, excessive skin-picking, hair-pulling, and the ingestion of toxins, current usage distinguishes these behaviors from self-harm. Likewise, tissue damage from drug abuse or eating disorders is not considered self-harm because it is ordinarily an unintended side-effect but context may be needed as intent for such acts varies.

Although self-harm is by definition non-suicidal, it may still be life-threatening. People who do self-harm are more likely to die by suicide, and self-harm is found in 40–60% of suicides. Still, only a minority of those who self-harm are suicidal.

The desire to self-harm is a common symptom of some personality disorders. People with other mental disorders may also self-harm, including those with depression, anxiety disorders, substance abuse, mood disorders, eating disorders, post-traumatic stress disorder, schizophrenia, dissociative disorders, and gender dysphoria. Studies also provide strong support for a self-punishment function, and modest evidence for anti-dissociation, interpersonal-influence, anti-suicide, sensation-seeking, and interpersonal boundaries functions. Self-harm can also occur in high-functioning individuals who have no underlying mental health diagnosis. The motivations for self-harm vary. Some use it as a coping mechanism to provide temporary relief of intense feelings such as anxiety, depression, stress, emotional numbness, or a sense of failure. Self-harm is often associated with a history of trauma, including emotional and sexual abuse. There are a number of different methods that can be used to treat self-harm, which concentrate on either treating the underlying causes or on treating the behavior itself. Other approaches involve avoidance techniques, which focus on keeping the individual occupied with other activities, or replacing the act of self-harm with safer methods that do not lead to permanent damage.

Self-harm is most common between the ages of 12 and 24. Self-harm in childhood is relatively rare, but the rate has been increasing since the 1980s. Self-harm can also occur in the elderly population. The risk of serious injury and suicide is higher in older people who self-harm. Captive animals, such as birds and monkeys, are also known to participate in self-harming behavior.

Classification 
Self-harm (SH), also referred to as self-injury (SI), self-inflicted violence (SIV), nonsuicidal self injury (NSSI) or self-injurious behavior (SIB), are different terms to ascribe behaviors where demonstrable injury is self-inflicted. The behavior involves deliberate tissue damage that is usually performed without suicidal intent. Some sources define self-harm more broadly than self-injury, such as to include drug overdose, eating disorders, and other acts that do not directly lead to visible injuries. The most common form of self-harm involves cutting of the skin using a sharp object, e.g. a knife or razor blade. The term self-mutilation is also sometimes used, although this phrase evokes connotations that some find worrisome, inaccurate, or offensive. Others use the phrase self-soothing as intentionally positive terminology to counter more negative associations. Self-inflicted wounds is a specific term associated with soldiers to describe non-lethal injuries inflicted in order to obtain early dismissal from combat.

The older literature has used several different terms. For this reason research in the past decades has inconsistently focused on self-harming behavior without and with suicidal intent (including suicide attempts) with varying definitions leading to inconsistent and unclear results.

Nonsuicidal self-injury (NSSI) has been listed in section 2 of the DSM-5-TR under the category "other conditions that may be a focus of clinical attention". While NSSI is not a separate mental disorder, the DSM-5-TR adds a diagnostic code for the condition in-line with the ICD. The disorder is defined as intentional self-inflicted injury without the intent of dying by suicide. Criteria for NSSI include five or more days of self-inflicted harm over the course of one year without suicidal intent, and the individual must have been motivated by seeking relief from a negative state, resolving an interpersonal difficulty, or achieving a positive state.

A common belief regarding self-harm is that it is an attention-seeking behavior; however, in many cases, this is inaccurate. Many self-harmers are very self-conscious of their wounds and scars and feel guilty about their behavior, leading them to go to great lengths to conceal their behavior from others. They may offer alternative explanations for their injuries, or conceal their scars with clothing. Self-harm in such individuals may not be associated with suicidal or para-suicidal behavior. People who self-harm are not usually seeking to end their own life; it has been suggested instead that they are using self-harm as a coping mechanism to relieve emotional pain or discomfort or as an attempt to communicate distress. 

Studies of individuals with developmental disabilities (such as intellectual disability) have shown self-harm being dependent on environmental factors such as obtaining attention or escape from demands. Some individuals may have dissociation harboring a desire to feel real or to fit into society's rules.

Signs and symptoms 
Eighty percent of self-harm involves stabbing or cutting the skin with a sharp object, sometimes breaking through the skin entirely. However, the number of self-harm methods are only limited by an individual's inventiveness and their determination to harm themselves; this includes burning, self-poisoning, alcohol abuse, self-embedding of objects, hair pulling, bruising/hitting one's self, scratching to hurt one's self, knowingly abusing over-the-counter or prescription drugs, and forms of self-harm related to anorexia and bulimia. The locations of self-harm are often areas of the body that are easily hidden and concealed from the detection of others. As well as defining self-harm in terms of the act of damaging the body, it may be more accurate to define self-harm in terms of the intent, and the emotional distress that the person is attempting to deal with. Neither the DSM-IV-TR nor the ICD-10 provide diagnostic criteria for self-harm. It is often seen as only a symptom of an underlying disorder, though many people who self-harm would like this to be addressed.
Common signs that a person may be engaging in self-harm include the following: they ensure that there are always harmful objects close by, they are experiencing difficulties in their personal relationships, their behavior becomes unpredictable, they question their worth and identity, they make statements that display helplessness and hopelessness.

Cause

Mental disorder 
Although some people who self-harm do not have any form of recognized mental disorder, many people experiencing various forms of mental illnesses do have a higher risk of self-harm. The key areas of disorder which exhibit an increased risk include autism spectrum disorders, borderline personality disorder, dissociative disorders, bipolar disorder, depression, phobias, and conduct disorders. As many as 70% of individuals with borderline personality disorder engage in self-harm. An estimated 30% of individuals with autism spectrum disorders engage in self-harm at some point, including eye-poking, skin-picking, hand-biting, and head-banging. Schizophrenia may also be a contributing factor for self-harm. Those diagnosed with schizophrenia have a high risk of suicide, which is particularly greater in younger patients as they may not have an insight into the serious effects that the disorder can have on their lives. There are parallels between self-harm and Münchausen syndrome, a psychiatric disorder in which individuals feign illness or trauma. There may be a common ground of inner distress culminating in self-directed harm in a Münchausen patient. However, a desire to deceive medical personnel in order to gain treatment and attention is more important in Münchausen's than in self-harm.

Psychological factors 

Self-harm is frequently described as an experience of depersonalization or a dissociative state. Abuse during childhood is accepted as a primary social factor increasing the incidence of self-harm, as is bereavement, and troubled parental or partner relationships. Factors such as war, poverty, unemployment, and substance abuse may also contribute. Other predictors of self-harm and suicidal behavior include feelings of entrapment, defeat, lack of belonging, and perceiving oneself as a burden along with having an impulsive personality and/or less effective social problem-solving skills. The onset of puberty, including the onset of sexual activity, often correlates with the onset of self-harm; this is because the pubertal period is associated with neurodevelopmental vulnerability and comes with an increased risk of emotional disorders and risk-taking behaviors. Transgender adolescents are significantly more likely to engage in self-harm than their cisgender peers. This can be attributed to distress caused by gender dysphoria as well as increased likelihoods of experiencing bullying, abuse, and mental illness.

Genetics 

The most distinctive characteristic of the rare genetic condition, Lesch–Nyhan syndrome, is uncontrollable self-harm and self-mutilation, and may include biting (particularly of the skin, nails and lips) and head-banging. Genetics may contribute to the risk of developing other psychological conditions, such as anxiety or depression, which could in turn lead to self-harming behavior. However, the link between genetics and self-harm in otherwise healthy patients is largely inconclusive.

Drugs and alcohol 

Substance misuse, dependence and withdrawal are associated with self-harm. Benzodiazepine dependence as well as benzodiazepine withdrawal is associated with self-harming behavior in young people. Alcohol is a major risk factor for self-harm. A study which analysed self-harm presentations to emergency rooms in Northern Ireland found that alcohol was a major contributing factor and involved in 63.8% of self-harm presentations. A recent study in the relation between cannabis use and deliberate self-harm (DSH) in Norway and England found that, in general, cannabis use may not be a specific risk factor for DSH in young adolescents. Smoking has also been associated with self-harm in adolescents; one study found that suicide attempts were four times higher for adolescents that smoke than for those that do not. A more recent meta-analysis on literature concerning the association between cannabis use and  self-injurious behaviors has defined the extent of this association, which is significant both at the cross-sectional  (odds ratio = 1.569, 95% confidence interval [1.167-2.108]) and longitudinal (odds ratio = 2.569, 95% confidence interval [2.207-3.256]) levels, and highlighting the role of the chronic use of the substance, and the presence of depressive symptoms or of mental disorders as factors that might increase the risk of self-injury among cannabis users.

Pathophysiology 

Self-harm is not typically suicidal behavior, although there is the possibility that a self-inflicted injury may result in life-threatening damage. Although the person may not recognise the connection, self-harm often becomes a response to profound and overwhelming emotional pain that cannot be resolved in a more functional way.

The motivations for self-harm vary, as it may be used to fulfill a number of different functions. These functions include self-harm being used as a coping mechanism which provides temporary relief of intense feelings such as anxiety, depression, stress, emotional numbness and a sense of failure or self-loathing. There is also a positive statistical correlation between self-harm and emotional abuse. Self-harm may become a means of managing and controlling pain, in contrast to the pain experienced earlier in the person's life over which they had no control (e.g., through abuse).

Other motives for self-harm do not fit into medicalized models of behavior and may seem incomprehensible to others, as demonstrated by this quotation:
"My motivations for self-harming were diverse, but included examining the interior of my arms for hydraulic lines. This may sound strange."

Assessment of motives in a medical setting is usually based on precursors to the incident, circumstances, and information from the patient. However, limited studies show that professional assessments tend to suggest more manipulative or punitive motives than personal assessments.

A UK Office for National Statistics study reported only two motives: "to draw attention" and "because of anger". For some people, harming themselves can be a means of drawing attention to the need for help and to ask for assistance in an indirect way. It may also be an attempt to affect others and to manipulate them in some way emotionally. However, those with chronic, repetitive self-harm often do not want attention and hide their scars carefully.

Many people who self-harm state that it allows them to "go away" or dissociate, separating the mind from feelings that are causing anguish. This may be achieved by tricking the mind into believing that the present suffering being felt is caused by the self-harm instead of the issues they were facing previously: the physical pain therefore acts as a distraction from the original emotional pain. To complement this theory, one can consider the need to "stop" feeling emotional pain and mental agitation. "A person may be hyper-sensitive and overwhelmed; a great many thoughts may be revolving within their mind, and they may either become triggered or could make a decision to stop the overwhelming feelings."

Alternatively, self-harm may be a means of feeling something, even if the sensation is unpleasant and painful. Those who self-harm sometimes describe feelings of emptiness or numbness (anhedonia), and physical pain may be a relief from these feelings. "A person may be detached from themselves, detached from life, numb and unfeeling. They may then recognise the need to function more, or have a desire to feel real again, and a decision is made to create sensation and 'wake up'."

Those who engage in self-harm face the contradictory reality of harming themselves while at the same time obtaining relief from this act. It may even be hard for some to actually initiate cutting, but they often do because they know the relief that will follow. For some self-harmers this relief is primarily psychological while for others this feeling of relief comes from the beta endorphins released in the brain. Endorphins are endogenous opioids that are released in response to physical injury, acting as natural painkillers and inducing pleasant feelings, and in response to self-harm would act to reduce tension and emotional distress. Many self-harmers report feeling very little to no pain while self-harming and, for some, deliberate self-harm may become a means of seeking pleasure.

As a coping mechanism, self-harm can become psychologically addictive because, to the self-harmer, it works; it enables them to deal with intense stress in the current moment. The patterns sometimes created by it, such as specific time intervals between acts of self-harm, can also create a behavioral pattern that can result in a wanting or craving to fulfill thoughts of self-harm.

Autonomic nervous system 
Emotional pain activates the same regions of the brain as physical pain, so emotional stress can be a significantly intolerable state for some people. Some of this is environmental and some of this is due to physiological differences in responding. The autonomic nervous system is composed of two components: the sympathetic nervous system controls arousal and physical activation (e.g., the fight-or-flight response) and the parasympathetic nervous system controls physical processes that are automatic (e.g., saliva production). The sympathetic nervous system innervates (e.g., is physically connected to and regulates) many parts of the body involved in stress responses. Studies of adolescents have shown that adolescents who self-injure have greater physiological reactivity (e.g., skin conductance) to stress than adolescents who do not self-injure. This stress response persists over time, staying constant or even increasing in self-injuring adolescents, but gradually decreases in adolescents who do not self-injure.

Treatment 
Several forms of psychosocial treatments can be used in self-harm including dialectical behavior therapy. Psychiatric and personality disorders are common in individuals who self-harm and as a result self-harm may be an indicator of depression and/or other psychological problems. Many people who self-harm have moderate or severe depression and therefore treatment with antidepressant medications may often be used. There is tentative evidence for the medication flupentixol; however, greater study is required before it can be recommended.

Emergency departments are often the first point of contact with healthcare for people who self-harm. As such they are crucial in supporting them and can play a role in preventing suicide. At the same time, according to a study conducted in England, people who self-harm often experience that they don't receive meaningful care at the emergency department. Both people who self-harm and staff in the study highlighted the failure of the healthcare system to support, the lack of specialist care. People who self-harm in the study often felt shame or being judged due to their condition, and said that being listened to and validated gave them hope. At the same time staff experienced frustration from being powerless to help and were afraid of being blamed if someone commits suicide.

Therapy 
Dialectical behavior therapy for adolescents (DBT-A) is a well-established treatment for self-injurious behavior in youth and is probably useful for decreasing the risk of non-suicidal self-injury. Several other treatments including integrated CBT (I-CBT), attachment-based family therapy (ABFT), resourceful adolescent parent program (RAP-P), intensive interpersonal psychotherapy for adolescents (IPT-A-IN), mentalization-based treatment for adolescents (MBT-A), and integrated family therapy are probably efficacious. Cognitive behavioral therapy may also be used to assist those with Axis I diagnoses, such as depression, schizophrenia, and bipolar disorder. Dialectical behavior therapy (DBT) can be successful for those individuals exhibiting a personality disorder, and could potentially be used for those with other mental disorders who exhibit self-harming behavior. Diagnosis and treatment of the causes of self-harm is thought by many to be the best approach to treating self-harm. But in some cases, particularly in people with a personality disorder, this is not very effective, so more clinicians are starting to take a DBT approach in order to reduce the behavior itself. People who rely on habitual self-harm are sometimes hospitalized, based on their stability, their ability, and especially their willingness to get help. In adolescents multisystem therapy shows promise. Pharmacotherapy has not been tested as a treatment for adolescents who self-harmed. According to the classification of Walsh and Rosen  trichotillomania and nail-biting represent class I and II self-mutilation behavior (see classification section in this article); for these conditions habit reversal training and decoupling have been found effective according to meta-analytic evidence. 

A meta-analysis found that psychological therapy is effective in reducing self-harm. The proportion of the adolescents who self-harmed over the follow-up period was lower in the intervention groups (28%) than in controls (33%). Psychological therapies with the largest effect sizes were dialectical behavior therapy (DBT), cognitive-behavioral therapy (CBT), and mentalization-based therapy (MBT).

In individuals with developmental disabilities, occurrence of self-harm is often demonstrated to be related to its effects on the environment, such as obtaining attention or desired materials or escaping demands. As developmentally disabled individuals often have communication or social deficits, self-harm may be their way of obtaining these things which they are otherwise unable to obtain in a socially appropriate way (such as by asking). One approach for treating self-harm thus is to teach an alternative, appropriate response which obtains the same result as the self-harm.

Avoidance techniques 

Generating alternative behaviors that the person can engage in instead of self-harm is one successful behavioral method that is employed to avoid self-harm. Techniques, aimed at keeping busy, may include journaling, taking a walk, participating in sports or exercise or being around friends when the person has the urge to harm themselves. The removal of objects used for self-harm from easy reach is also helpful for resisting self-harming urges. The provision of a card that allows the person to make emergency contact with counselling services should the urge to self-harm arise may also help prevent the act of self-harm. Alternative and safer methods of self-harm that do not lead to permanent damage, for example the snapping of a rubber band on the wrist, may also help calm the urge to self-harm. Using biofeedback may help raise self-awareness of certain pre-occupations or particular mental state or mood that precede bouts of self-harming behavior, and help identify techniques to avoid those pre-occupations before they lead to self-harm. Any avoidance or coping strategy must be appropriate to the individual's motivation and reason for harming.

Epidemiology 

It is difficult to gain an accurate picture of incidence and prevalence of self-harm. This is due in a part to a lack of sufficient numbers of dedicated research centres to provide a continuous monitoring system. However, even with sufficient resources, statistical estimates are crude since most incidences of self-harm are undisclosed to the medical profession as acts of self-harm are frequently carried out in secret, and wounds may be superficial and easily treated by the individual. Recorded figures can be based on three sources: psychiatric samples, hospital admissions and general population surveys.

The World Health Organization estimates that, as of 2010, 880,000 deaths occur as a result of self-harm. About 10% of admissions to medical wards in the UK are as a result of self-harm, the majority of which are drug overdoses. However, studies based only on hospital admissions may hide the larger group of self-harmers who do not need or seek hospital treatment for their injuries, instead treating themselves. Many adolescents who present to general hospitals with deliberate self-harm report previous episodes for which they did not receive medical attention. In the United States up to 4% of adults self-harm with approximately 1% of the population engaging in chronic or severe self-harm.

Current research suggests that the rates of self-harm are much higher among young people with the average age of onset between 14 and 24. The earliest reported incidents of self-harm are in children between 5 and 7 years old. In the UK in 2008 rates of self-harm in young people could be as high as 33%. In addition there appears to be an increased risk of self-harm in college students than among the general population. In a study of undergraduate students in the US, 9.8% of the students surveyed indicated that they had purposefully cut or burned themselves on at least one occasion in the past. When the definition of self-harm was expanded to include head-banging, scratching oneself, and hitting oneself along with cutting and burning, 32% of the sample said they had done this. In Ireland, a study found that instances of hospital-treated self-harm were much higher in city and urban districts, than in rural settings. The CASE (Child & Adolescent Self-harm in Europe) study suggests that the life-time risk of self-injury is ~1:7 for women and ~1:25 for men.

Gender differences 

In general, the latest aggregated research has found no difference in the prevalence of self-harm between men and women. This is in contrast to past research which indicated that up to four times as many females as males have direct experience of self-harm. However, caution is needed in seeing self-harm as a greater problem for females, since males may engage in different forms of self-harm (e.g., hitting themselves) which could be easier to hide or explained as the result of different circumstances. Hence, there remain widely opposing views as to whether the gender paradox is a real phenomenon, or merely the artifact of bias in data collection.

The WHO/EURO Multicentre Study of Suicide, established in 1989, demonstrated that, for each age group, the female rate of self-harm exceeded that of the males, with the highest rate among females in the 13–24 age group and the highest rate among males in the 12–34 age group. However, this discrepancy has been known to vary significantly depending upon population and methodological criteria, consistent with wide-ranging uncertainties in gathering and interpreting data regarding rates of self-harm in general. Such problems have sometimes been the focus of criticism in the context of broader psychosocial interpretation. For example, feminist author Barbara Brickman has speculated that reported gender differences in rates of self-harm are due to deliberate socially biased methodological and sampling errors, directly blaming medical discourse for pathologising the female.

This gender discrepancy is often distorted in specific populations where rates of self-harm are inordinately high, which may have implications on the significance and interpretation of psychosocial factors other than gender. A study in 2003 found an extremely high prevalence of self-harm among 428 homeless and runaway youths (aged 16–19) with 72% of males and 66% of females reporting a history of self-harm. However, in 2008, a study of young people and self-harm saw the gender gap widen in the opposite direction, with 32% of young females, and 22% of young males admitting to self-harm. Studies also indicate that males who self-harm may also be at a greater risk of completing suicide.

There does not appear to be a difference in motivation for self-harm in adolescent males and females. Triggering factors such as low self-esteem and having friends and family members who self-harm are also common between both males and females. One limited study found that, among those young individuals who do self-harm, both genders are just as equally likely to use the method of skin-cutting. However, females who self-cut are more likely than males to explain their self-harm episode by saying that they had wanted to punish themselves. In New Zealand, more females are hospitalized for intentional self-harm than males. Females more commonly choose methods such as self-poisoning that generally are not fatal, but still serious enough to require hospitalization.

Elderly 

In a study of a district general hospital in the UK, 5.4% of all the hospital's self-harm cases were aged over 65. The male to female ratio was 2:3 although the self-harm rates for males and females over 65 in the local population were identical. Over 90% had depressive conditions, and 63% had significant physical illness. Under 10% of the patients gave a history of earlier self-harm, while both the repetition and suicide rates were very low, which could be explained by the absence of factors known to be associated with repetition, such as personality disorder and alcohol abuse. However, NICE Guidance on Self-harm in the UK suggests that older people who self-harm are at a greater risk of completing suicide, with 1 in 5 older people who self-harm going on to end their life. A study completed in Ireland showed that older Irish adults have high rates of deliberate self-harm, but comparatively low rates of suicide.

Developing world 

Only recently have attempts to improve health in the developing world concentrated on not only physical illness but also mental health. Deliberate self-harm is common in the developing world. Research into self-harm in the developing world is however still very limited although an important case study is that of Sri Lanka, which is a country exhibiting a high incidence of suicide and self-poisoning with agricultural pesticides or natural poisons. Many people admitted for deliberate self-poisoning during a study by Eddleston et al. were young and few expressed a desire to die, but death was relatively common in the young in these cases. The improvement of medical management of acute poisoning in the developing world is poor and improvements are required in order to reduce mortality.

Some of the causes of deliberate self-poisoning in Sri Lankan adolescents included bereavement and harsh discipline by parents. The coping mechanisms are being spread in local communities as people are surrounded by others who have previously deliberately harmed themselves or attempted suicide. One way of reducing self-harm would be to limit access to poisons; however many cases involve pesticides or yellow oleander seeds, and the reduction of access to these agents would be difficult. Great potential for the reduction of self-harm lies in education and prevention, but limited resources in the developing world make these methods challenging.

Prison inmates 

Deliberate self-harm is especially prevalent in prison populations. A proposed explanation for this is that prisons are often violent places, and prisoners who wish to avoid physical confrontations may resort to self-harm as a ruse, either to convince other prisoners that they are dangerously insane and resilient to pain or to obtain protection from the prison authorities. Self-harm also occurs frequently in inmates who are placed in solitary confinement.

History 

Self-harm was, and in some cases continues to be, a ritual practice in many cultures and religions.

The Maya priesthood performed auto-sacrifice by cutting and piercing their bodies in order to draw blood. A reference to the priests of Baal "cutting themselves with blades until blood flowed" can be found in the Hebrew Bible. However, in Judaism, such self-harm is forbidden under Mosaic law. It occurred in ancient Canaanite mourning rituals, as described in the Ras Shamra tablets.

Self-harm is practised in Hinduism by the ascetics known as sadhus. In Catholicism it is known as mortification of the flesh. Some branches of Islam mark the Day of Ashura, the commemoration of the martyrdom of Imam Hussein, with a ritual of self-flagellation, using chains and swords.

Dueling scars such as those acquired through academic fencing at certain traditional German universities are an early example of scarification in European society. Sometimes, students who did not fence would scar themselves with razors in imitation.

Constance Lytton, a prominent suffragette, used a stint in Holloway Prison during March 1909 to mutilate her body. Her plan was to carve 'Votes for Women' from her breast to her cheek, so that it would always be visible. But after completing the V on her breast and ribs she requested sterile dressings to avoid blood poisoning, and her plan was aborted by the authorities. She wrote of this in her memoir Prisons and Prisoners.

Kikuyu girls cut each other's vulvas in the 1950s as a symbol of defiance, in the context of the campaign against female genital mutilation in colonial Kenya. The movement came to be known as Ngaitana ("I will circumcise myself"), because to avoid naming their friends the girls said they had cut themselves. Historian Lynn Thomas described the episode as significant in the history of FGM because it made clear that its victims were also its perpetrators.

Classification 
The term "self-mutilation" occurred in a study by L. E. Emerson in 1913 where he considered self-cutting a symbolic substitution for masturbation. The term reappeared in an article in 1935 and a book in 1938 when Karl Menninger refined his conceptual definitions of self-mutilation. His study on self-destructiveness differentiated between suicidal behaviors and self-mutilation. For Menninger, self-mutilation was a non-fatal expression of an attenuated death wish and thus coined the term partial suicide. He began a classification system of six types:

 neurotic – nail-biters, pickers, extreme hair removal and unnecessary cosmetic surgery.
 religious – self-flagellants and others.
 puberty rites – hymen removal, circumcision or clitoral alteration.
 psychotic – eye or ear removal, genital self-mutilation and extreme amputation
 organic brain diseases – which allow repetitive head-banging, hand-biting, finger-fracturing or eye removal.
 conventional – nail-clipping, trimming of hair and shaving beards.

Pao (1969) differentiated between delicate (low lethality) and coarse (high lethality) self-mutilators who cut. The "delicate" cutters were young, multiple episodic of superficial cuts and generally had borderline personality disorder diagnosis. The "coarse" cutters were older and generally psychotic. Ross and McKay (1979) categorized self-mutilators into nine groups: cutting, biting, abrading, severing, inserting, burning, ingesting or inhaling, hitting, and constricting.

After the 1970s the focus of self-harm shifted from Freudian psycho-sexual drives of the patients.

Walsh and Rosen (1988) created four categories numbered by Roman numerals I–IV, defining Self-mutilation as rows II, III and IV.

Favazza and Rosenthal (1993) reviewed hundreds of studies and divided self-mutilation into two categories: culturally sanctioned self-mutilation and deviant self-mutilation. Favazza also created two subcategories of sanctioned self-mutilations; rituals and practices. The rituals are mutilations repeated generationally and "reflect the traditions, symbolism, and beliefs of a society" (p. 226). Practices are historically transient and cosmetic such as piercing of earlobes, nose, eyebrows as well as male circumcision while deviant self-mutilation is equivalent to self-harm.

Awareness and opposition 

There are many movements among the general self-harm community to make self-harm itself and treatment better known to mental health professionals, as well as the general public. For example, March 1 is designated as Self-injury Awareness Day (SIAD) around the world. On this day, some people choose to be more open about their own self-harm, and awareness organizations make special efforts to raise awareness about self-harm.

Other animals 
Self-harm in non-human mammals is a well-established but not widely known phenomenon. Its study under zoo or laboratory conditions could lead to a better understanding of self-harm in human patients.

Zoo or laboratory rearing and isolation are important factors leading to increased susceptibility to self-harm in higher mammals, e.g., macaque monkeys. Non-primate mammals are also known to mutilate themselves under laboratory conditions after administration of drugs. For example, pemoline, clonidine, amphetamine, and very high (toxic) doses of caffeine or theophylline are known to precipitate self-harm in lab animals.

In dogs, canine obsessive-compulsive disorder can lead to self-inflicted injuries, for example canine lick granuloma. Captive birds are sometimes known to engage in feather-plucking, causing damage to feathers that can range from feather shredding to the removal of most or all feathers within the bird's reach, or even the mutilation of skin or muscle tissue.

Breeders of show mice have noticed similar behaviors.
One known as "barbering" involves a mouse obsessively grooming the whiskers and facial fur off of themselves and cage-mates.

See also 
 Self-destructive behavior
 Self-hatred
 Self-Injurious Behavior Inhibiting System

References

External links 

 Information about self-harm from the Royal College of Psychiatrists

 
Symptoms and signs of mental disorders
Borderline personality disorder